Germany has experienced significant terrorism in its history, particularly during the Weimar Republic and during the Cold War, carried out by far-left and far-right German groups as well as by foreign terrorist organisations.

In recent years, far-left, far-right and Islamist extremist violence have resurged, and groups have been suspected of terrorism or terrorist plans.

Weimar Republic
Germany's loss in the First World War resulted in a chaotic situation, with multiple far-left and far-right organisations attempting to seize power. Both the far left and the far right organised their own militias, and carried out assassinations. For example, the Foreign Minister Walther Rathenau was assassinated in 1922 by a far-right group. Members of the Communist Party of Germany assassinated police captains Paul Anlauf and Franz Lenck in Berlin in 1931.

Terrorism in Germany

Turkish and Kurdish Islamist groups are also active in Germany, and Turkish and Kurdish Islamists have co-operated in Germany as in the case of the Sauerland terror cell. Political scientist Guido Steinberg stated that many top leaders of Islamist organizations in Turkey fled to Germany in the 2000s, and that the Turkish (Kurdish) Hezbollah has also "left an imprint on Turkish Kurds in Germany." Also many Kurds from Iraq (there are about 50,000 to 80,000 Iraqi Kurds in Germany) financially supported Kurdish-Islamist groups like Ansar al-Islam.  Many Islamists in Germany are ethnic Kurds (Iraqi and Turkish Kurds) or Turks. Before 2006, the German Islamist scene was dominated by Iraqi Kurds and Palestinians, but since 2006 Kurds from Turkey and Turks are dominant.

According to a research conducted by the Abba Eban Institute as part of an initiative called Janus Initiative, Shiite clans in Germany are involved in organized crime and are specifically supporting Hezbollah.

Since 2010, 15 people have died in Islamic terrorist attacks in Germany and an additional 74 have been injured. There is also a number of violent incidents which are disputed to either have been conducted by Lone-wolf Islamic terrorists or by mentally ill people.

In 2015, 11 verdicts concerning jihadist terrorism related offences were issued by German courts. In 2016, 28 verdicts for jihadist terrorism related offences were delivered. In 2017 there were 27 verdicts.

Almost all known terrorist networks and individuals in Germany have links to Salafism, an ultra-conservative Islamic ideology.

Terrorism in (or involving) West Germany and reunified Germany

During the Cold War, especially in the 1970s, West Germany experienced severe terrorism, mostly perpetrated by far-left terrorist groups and culminating in the German Autumn of 1977, the country's most serious national crisis in postwar history. Terrorist incidents also took place in the 1980s and 1990s. Some of the terrorist groups had connections to international terrorism, notably Palestinian militant groups, and were aided and abetted by the communist regime of East Germany.



Islamic terrorism

Thwarted islamist terror attacks 
In December 2019, German authorities reported to have thwarted ten Islamic terrorist plots since the 2016 Berlin truck attack. Among these:

2006 German train bombing plot
2007 bomb plot in Germany
2015 Eschborn-Frankfurt City Loop
2016 Düsseldorf terrorism plot
2016 Chemnitz terrorism plot
2016 Ludwigshafen terrorism plot
2018 Cologne terrorist plot

List of international terrorist incidents (outside Germany) with significant German casualties
Eleven German nationals died as a result of the 11 September attacks in The United States on 11 September 2001.
Six German nationals died as a result of the bombing of several Balinese tourist clubs in Indonesia on 12 October 2002.
Fourteen German nationals died as a result of the bombing of a synagogue on the island of Djerba in Tunisia on 11 April 2002.
12 out of 13 tourists killed in the January 2016 Istanbul bombing were German, while another six were injured.

Response to terrorism
The terrorism of the 1970s has formed Germany's political culture and its policy of not negotiating with terrorists. It also led to the formation of the GSG9 counter-terrorism unit. In 1972, a law was passed, the Extremist Act (Radikalenerlass), which banned radicals or those with a 'questionable' political persuasion from public sector jobs.

In 2019 the Federal Criminal Police Office created a department dedicated towards Islamic terrorism and extremism.

Traditionally counter-terrorist organisations in Germany have been slower to respond to extreme right-wing groups than extreme left-wing ones. It has been suggested that this is due to the extreme right being seen as corrigible (fighting for attainable, tangible goals that can be negotiated) while the extreme left are regarded as incorrigible (fighting for ideological goals that are "pure" and cannot be negotiated). Thus because the extreme left are seen as targeting the heart of the German political system while the extreme right is not, this tends to result in a reduced response to extreme right-wing terrorism. In addition, far-right terrorism was at times dubiously regarded as a form of terrorism by the security services, as it did not seem to have self-explanatory political statements nor were any official announcements made by far-right groups explaining the act; for example, a house burning of Turkish immigrants was initially blamed on organised crime and was only later determined to have been perpetrated by extreme right-wing groups, leading officials to doubt it was a form of terrorism as it did not seem to have any broader political goals beyond the killing itself.

In popular culture

A number of books and films address this topic.

Films

Brandstifter (Arsonists) (1969)
The Lost Honor of Katharina Blum (1975)
Germany in Autumn (1978)
The Third Generation (1979)
The German Sisters (1981)
Stammheim (1986)
Die Hard (1988)
Die Hard With A Vengeance (1995)
 (1997)
The State I Am In (2000)
The Legend of Rita (2000)
Black Box BRD (2001)
Baader (2002)
Enemy of the State (2003)
In Love With Terror (2003)
Munich (2005)
The Baader Meinhof Complex (2008)
Children of the Revolution (2010)
A Most Wanted Man (2014)
NSU German History X (2016)

See also

Right-wing terrorism in Germany
Terrorism in the European Union
NSU murders
List of massacres in Germany

References
 German Jihad: On the Internationalisation of Islamist Terrorism by Guido Steinberg. Columbia University Press, 2013

Further reading
 

 
Human rights abuses in Germany
Germany